|

Tanya Yvette Hughes (née Jones; born January 25, 1972) is a retired high jumper from the United States, who set her personal best on May 22, 1992, jumping 1.97 metres at a meet in Eugene, Oregon.

Born in Baltimore, Maryland, Hughes is a three-time American junior national indoor champion: 1989, 1990 and 1991, and a two-time national outdoor champion (1992 and 1993).  She was a member of the 1992 US Olympic team in Barcelona, Spain.  In 1993 she won gold at the World University Games in Buffalo, New York.  Tanya attended the University of Arizona where she was a four-time NCAA high jump champion (indoor-1991 and Outdoor-1991, 1992, 1993). She was named the 1994 NCAA Woman of the Year based on her scholarship, leadership and athletic accomplishments over her collegiate career.  Her 1991 clearance of 1.94m, stood as the American junior high jump record until 2015.

Achievements
All results regarding high jump.

References

 Women's World All-Time List
 IAAF site
 

1972 births
Living people
Track and field athletes from Baltimore
American female high jumpers
Athletes (track and field) at the 1991 Pan American Games
Athletes (track and field) at the 1992 Summer Olympics
Olympic track and field athletes of the United States
World Athletics Championships athletes for the United States
Universiade medalists in athletics (track and field)
Universiade gold medalists for the United States
Medalists at the 1993 Summer Universiade
Pan American Games track and field athletes for the United States
21st-century American women
Arizona Wildcats women's track and field athletes